Zygmunt Kałużyński (11 December 1918 – 30 September 2004) was a Polish film critic, promoter of cinema, erudite, lawyer, long-time contributor of Polityka magazine and a TV personality. His opinions were often controversial, with some even accusing him of doing harm to the Polish cinema industry. Despite that, he enjoyed a devoted fan base.

References 

Polish film critics
1918 births
2004 deaths